Ernestine Saankaláxt Hayes (born 1945) belongs to the Kaagwaaataan clan, also known as the wolf house, representing the Eagle side of the Tlingit Nation. Hayes is a Tlingit author and an Emerita retired professor at the University of Alaska Southeast (UAS) in Juneau, Alaska. As an author, Hayes is a (Tlingit) memoirist, essayist, and poet. She was selected as the Alaska State Writer Laureate in 2016 and served in that position until 2018.

Early life
Ernestine Hayes, with ancestors of Tlingit descent from the Island of Sitka, was born in Juneau Indian Village. Hayes was raised by her mother and grandmother in Juneau, where she spent her first fifteen years learning about her heritage, the Tlingit language, and the traditions of Alaskan Natives. At the age of fifteen, Hayes and her mother moved out of Alaska, to California.

Career 
Hayes returned to Alaska twenty-five years later, in 1985, where Hayes graduated magna cum laude from the University of Alaska Southeast. In 2003, she graduated from University of Alaska Anchorage with a Master of Fine Arts degree in Creative Writing and Literary Arts. Almost immediately after earning her MFA, she began teaching at the University of Alaska Southeast, while also serving as associated faculty for the University of Alaska Anchorage's low-residence MFA program. Hayes actively promotes Native rights and culture, and strives to help decolonize the institution.  For just over a year, she wrote a column, "Edge of the Village," for the Juneau Empire. As State Writer Laureate, from 2016 to 2018, Hayes visited many small communities of Alaska, like Seward and Seldovia, where she held two-day creative writing workshops. Right now, Hayes is working on a her third Alaskan Native Memoir.

Reviews

Blonde Indian 
Blonde Indian, a memoir of Hayes's childhood in Southeast Alaska is written with traditional Tlingit stories, fictional character, and historic moments. Blonde Indian is the memoir of Tlingit writer and story-teller Ernestine Hayes. Because of Hayes' fair hair, her grandmother sang out to her "Blonde Indian, blonde Indian" as Hayes danced along. The  fictional tale of “Tom,” coincides with an experience similar to Hayes, an Alaskan Native child who is separated from their traditional lifestyle and heritage. In Blonde Indian, Hayes elaborates on her experiences in Western society, narrating her lived experience and traditional stories to honors her Tlingit ancestors and tradition, while shedding light on the impact of colonization on indigenous children and families. Blonde Indian has received much critical acclaim. It was awarded the American Book Award in 2007.

The Tao of Raven 
A continuation of her work in Blonde Indian, The Tao of Raven: an Alaskan Native Memoir weaves together traditional Alaskan Native storytelling and life lessons, with personal memories from Hayes, and legends of the Raven, and the Spider. Thematically, the book centers around redefining the meaning of “treasure,” a word that Hayes explained as the time we’ve spent on the earth, rather than any material commodity.

Awards
2002 Alaska Native Writer Award Anchorage Daily News Fiction
2006 Native America Calling October Book of the Month
2007 Kiriyama Prize finalist for Blonde Indian, An Alaska Native Memoir
2007 PEN-USA non-fiction award finalist
2007 American Book Award.
2007 HAIL (Honoring Alaska Indigenous Literature) Award
2014 Alaska Literary Award
2015 Rasmuson Artist, Djerassi Artist Residency
2015 AWARE Woman of Distinction
2016 Named Alaska State Writer Laureate for 2017-2018
2021 Rasmuson Foundation Distinguished Artist Award

Works

 

Tao of Raven: An Alaska Native Memoir. 2017.

Anthologies

Essays

References

External links

"Winter in Lingit Aani Brings Magpies and Ravens"
"Hayes Wins American Book Award for her Memoir, 'Blonde Indian'"
"Children's Book Aims to Save Dying Alaska Language"

1945 births
Living people
21st-century Native Americans
Alaska Native people
American biographers
American Book Award winners
American memoirists
Native American writers
People from Juneau, Alaska
Tlingit people
University of Alaska Anchorage alumni
American women memoirists
Writers from Alaska
21st-century Native American women
Native American women writers